Ciriaco de Jesús Alas (April 7, 1866 in Santa Tecla, El Salvador,  - 1952 in Sonsonate) was a Salvadoran musician and composer.

He studied the violin with Rafael Olmedo and Juan Aberle, composer of the National Anthem of El Salvador, at the Liceo de San Luis. He also studied under the Dutchman Joseph Kessels. He served as professor of singing at the Central Institute of El Salvador. He was director of the Banda de La Unión, 1888-1890, and  Banda del Regimiento de Sonsonate (Sonsonate Regiment Band) from 1901-1944. Among his works are "El maestro Irma", "Neo Cadina", "Rosita", "Fantasía sobre motivos de la Caballería Rusticana", "Fantasía sobre motivos de El Trobador", and "La coronación".

References

Salvadoran musicians
Salvadoran violinists
Salvadoran composers
Male composers
1866 births
1952 deaths
People from Santa Tecla, El Salvador